Expeditors (Expeditors International of Washington) is an American worldwide logistics and freight forwarding company headquartered in Seattle, Washington.

Financial information
Expeditors became a publicly traded company in 1984 with the listing of its shares on NASDAQ under the ticker symbol EXPD and were named to the NASDAQ-100 in 2002.  During their first year as a public company, Expeditors reported more than $50 million in gross revenues and $2.1 million in net earnings.  Expeditors is currently #299 on the Fortune 500.  Total revenues exceeded 10 billion ($10.116 billion) in 2021.

They are known in the financial services community for their unconventional and entertaining SEC filings, which are rumored to be written by former CEO Peter Rose himself, as well as its responses to questions submitted to the company, which are placed on Expeditors' Investor website.  Rose announced his retirement in March 2014 as CEO, with his retirement as Chairman effective May 2015.

Compensation structure
Expeditors maintains a compensation structure that is unique to the logistics industry.  According to their 2003 annual report, "Each of the Company’s branches are independent profit centers and the primary compensation for the branch management group comes in the form of incentive-based compensation calculated directly from the operating income of that branch.  This compensation structure ensures that the allocation of revenue and expense among components of services [...] are done in an objective manner on a fair value basis."

See also

 Globalization
 World economy

References

External links
 

Companies based in Seattle
Transport companies established in 1979
American companies established in 1979
Companies in the Dow Jones Transportation Average
Companies listed on the Nasdaq
Multinational companies headquartered in the United States
Logistics companies of the United States
1979 establishments in Washington (state)
1980s initial public offerings
Transportation companies based in Washington (state)
Customs brokers